Syed Fakhar Imam (born 18 December 1942) is a Pakistani politician who served as Federal Minister for National Food Security and Research, from April 2020 to April 2022. He also served as the 11th Speaker of National Assembly of Pakistan from 1985 to 1986.

He has previously worked as the Chairman of Pakistan's Parliamentary Special Committee on Kashmir. He was educated at Aitchison College Lahore & Clifton College in England.

His wife Syeda Abida Hussain was also a minister in the government of Nawaz Sharif and his daughter Syeda Sughra Imam is also a politician. He was preceded by Malik Meraj Khalid as Speaker of National Assembly of Pakistan. He was elected to the national assembly and joined PTI.

On 6 April 2020 he was appointed as Federal Minister for National Food Security and Research.

References

|-

Leaders of the Opposition (Pakistan)
Living people
Aitchison College alumni
People educated at Clifton College
Speakers of the National Assembly of Pakistan
People from Khanewal District
Pakistani MNAs 1985–1988
Pakistani MNAs 1990–1993
1942 births
Pakistan Muslim League (N) MNAs
Pakistani MNAs 2018–2023
Pakistan Tehreek-e-Insaf MNAs
Federal ministers of Pakistan